Reflections is an album by saxophonist Frank Morgan which was recorded in 1988 and released on the Contemporary label the following year.

Reception

The review by AllMusic's Scott Yanow said: "Altoist Frank Morgan leads an all-star group on this excellent hard bop set. ... it is not surprising that Morgan sounds a bit inspired. The musicians all play up to their usual level ... Recommended".

Track listing 
 "Old Bowl, New Grits" (Mulgrew Miller) – 7:37
 "Reflections" (Thelonious Monk) – 7:16
 "Starting Over" (Bobby Hutcherson) – 6:09
 "Black Narcissus" (Joe Henderson) – 6:49
 "Sonnymoon for Two" (Sonny Rollins) – 9:06
 "O.K." (Ron Carter) – 6:11
 "Caravan" (Juan Tizol, Duke Ellington, Irving Mills) – 9:12 Additional track on CD release

Personnel

Performance
Frank Morgan – alto saxophone
Joe Henderson – tenor saxophone
Bobby Hutcherson – vibes
Mulgrew Miller – piano
Ron Carter – bass
Al Foster – drums

Production
Orrin Keepnews – producer
Danny Kopelson – engineer

References 

Frank Morgan (musician) albums
1989 albums
Contemporary Records albums
Albums produced by Orrin Keepnews